Neurothrips is a genus of tube-tailed thrips in the family Phlaeothripidae. There are about six described species in Neurothrips.

Species
These six species belong to the genus Neurothrips:
 Neurothrips allopterus Hood
 Neurothrips apache Hood, 1957
 Neurothrips frontalis Hood
 Neurothrips magnafemoralis (Hinds, 1902)
 Neurothrips punanus Stannard
 Neurothrips williamsi Hood

References

Further reading

 
 
 
 
 
 

Phlaeothripidae
Articles created by Qbugbot